is a professional Japanese baseball player. He plays infielder for the Orix Buffaloes.

References 

2002 births
Living people
Baseball people from Shizuoka Prefecture
Nippon Professional Baseball infielders
Orix Buffaloes players
People from Fujieda, Shizuoka